Pilot Island is an island in Lake Michigan in the Town of Washington, in Door County, Wisconsin; it is part of Green Bay National Wildlife Refuge. An abandoned lighthouse, the Pilot Island Light, rests on the island, and three shipwrecks rest in the Pilot Island NW Site. Pilot Island lies in the middle of the southern opening of the Porte des Morts passage off the tip of the Door Peninsula.

Pilot Island earned its name due to the use of the island as a "pilot" by sailors going through the dangerous Porte des Morts passage.

The lighthouse started operations in 1858 and continues to this day to be a maritime navigational aid. The island was often foggy and the fog signal would run for long periods of time, with the noise curdling milk and destroying embryos in their eggshells. The fog signal was discontinued in 1962.

Gallery

From the lake

Nearby islands

References

External links 
 Pilot Island, Web-Map of Door County, Wisconsin

Islands of Door County, Wisconsin
Islands of Lake Michigan in Wisconsin